Hillend may refer to:
Hillend, Fife
Hillend, Edinburgh